David Tal may refer to:

David Tal (historian), expert on Israel's security and diplomatic history and U.S. disarmament policy
David Tal (politician) (born 1950), four-time Member of Knesset and member of Israel's Kadima party
David Tal (Rosenthal), member of the band Hedva and David